GameKing is a brand of handheld game consoles, designed and developed by Timetop in 2003, for the Hong Kong consumer market. The brand has three consoles, the GameKing I, the GameKing II and the GameKing III. A fourth console, the Handy Game, was produced by Timetop and shares some branding, but otherwise has little to do with the GameKing franchise.

GameKing I (GM-218)
The original GameKing console is a 8-bit handheld game console. It is based around a 65C02 CPU running at 6.0 MHz.
It is fashioned to look like Nintendo's Game Boy Advance and comes in a wide array of vivid pastel colours, either opaque or transparent, and uses 2 AAA size batteries. The original GameKing lacks a backlit screen, a feature which has been added in its "successor", the GameKing II.

The consoles have above-average sound circuitry capable of multi-channel music and digital sound playback, but a comparably low quality greyscale LCD screen, only supporting four shades of grey and having a very low (48 by 32 pixels) resolution, combined with a slow refresh rate, poor readability and adjustments, compared to the original Game Boy.

Games can be compared to some of the earlier built-in cell phone games (pre Java games), while their playing speed (scrolling etc.) and audio is far superior (multi-channel music and digitized samples and voices are quite common in GameKing games).

Audio hardware

It is unclear whether the machine uses a traditional programmable sound generator or relies only on digital samples for music and sound effects. Many of its games have soundtracks consisting of short audio samples with a sampling rate of 8 kHz, as opposed to games on other systems such as the Game Boy where sound is generated by a custom programmable sound generator.

Video hardware
According to Brian Provinciano's reverse engineering of the GameKing, most GameKing games heavily rely on bitmap rather than tile-based rendering of the screen, e.g. most levels in its platform and shoot 'em up games are in reality large 4-colour bitmaps, instead of using the most common method of graphic tiles and tile maps, like in most other game consoles and arcade games. This was probably done for economic reasons (the CPU alone can handle all graphics easily, at that resolution) and easy development of the games, apart from the objectively low resolution of the screen. While such a scheme seems to work, it has the disadvantage of using cartridge space inefficiently, so that e.g. most platform games are limited to 3 levels.

GameKing II (GM-219)

The GameKing II, on the other hand, is fashioned to look like Sony's PlayStation Portable, comes in more sober colors (either black, grey, white or aqua - and although not shown on the packaging, yellow ones do also exist), and uses 3 AAA size batteries, of which only 2 are used to actually power up the GameKing's hardware, while the third one serves to power up both its built-in audio amplifier (a bit more powerful than the one on the original GameKing) and its backlit LCD screen (which can be turned on and off at will, depending on external lighting conditions, thus saving power). The unit can still work with 2 batteries, only with no sound and no backlighting available.

Also, the GameKing II has a fixed color background picture for its LCD screen, only visible when the backlighting is switched on. This is probably to give the false impression of having a colour LCD screen, as implied on its box.

The picture may vary between various GameKing models, however it has a mostly negative effect on screen readability when the backlighting is turned on.

This background picture can also be removed or replaced simply by opening the machine and removing the small plastic transparency behind the LCD. Removing it makes using the backlighting much more effective.

This model would also be the last in the Gameking line to have the text "3in1" stamped above the screen.

Notes: Likewise with the GK, no page exists for the GKII, but the Chinese site still lists the machine as product code GM-219.

GK "I" vs. GK II
However, the two models are fully hardware compatible, can use the same games/cartridges, both have volume and contrast controls and use the same LCD screen. Also, they both have an external DC power supply 3.5 mm minijack plug; however, the plug is not labeled as such, and its function is only slightly hinted at in the units' manuals. The GameKing requires 3V DC, while the GameKing2 requires 4.5V DC with the peculiarity of needing to keep at least one battery in the unit in order to have sound and backlighting.

GameKing III (GM-220)

TimeTop quietly released a third GameKing machine, called the 'GameKing III' or GM-220 sometime in 2005. While early advertisements showed the GameKing III with the same "false color" background picture as the GameKing I and II, which indicated that the system was black and white like the previous GameKing models, the GM-220 is full colour. Another distinction of the GM-220 is that unlike its predecessors, the Gameking I and II, which were promoted and marketed worldwide, the Gameking III was not distributed outside of Asia, making it much less common than the earlier models. In 2005, many websites initially reported the device as "coming soon", and it is not known why Timetop eventually decided to offer only a limited release. 

The resolution doesn't seem enhanced compared to an original GameKing, and "classic" GameKing cartridges are automatically colorized, while games especially developed for it allegedly make use of the full color palette, which for the moment remains unknown. The site claimed a total of 12 carts for this system. If the built-in game is included, 8 titles are known as of 2010.

A new design for the GKIII was placed in April 2006 at the Timetop site, and later removed (see GM-221, below).

GM-221

A second design for the Gameking III also exists which combines elements from the GM-219 with the GM-220. The Button design and layout is from the GM-220 design, with the "A" button being distinctly larger than the "B" button, but the overall form is obviously inspired from Sony's PSP design. Several colors are shown on the back of the box, green and orange for example, however only two colors, a black edition and a white edition are confirmed to exist.

GM-222

The GM-222 sports an original design, which does not borrow much from previous models.  Even though it is sequenced later than the other consoles in the Gameking line, and therefore one would expect more advanced hardware, it is in fact a redesigned Gameking II. Moreover, besides returning to the lo-res black and white screen, the back-light has also been removed (notice however that the box for the GM-221 and GM-222 both show exactly the same false color screen shot, despite the two machines vastly different capabilities). It is not known why Timetop chose to release the GM-222 in this fashion, although renderings exist that show this design was intended at some point to be a full color model. It was available in charcoal, blue, and green.

Handy Game (GM-228)

A distinct Timetop console exists which uses NES compatible hardware rather than the proprietary hardware of the other Gameking consoles, and also has an integrated TV output. While early mockups indicated this handheld was considered part of the Gameking line, Timetop eventually removed the gameking branding from this edition prior to its release, replacing it with "Timetop LTPS Handy Game" ( ironically, "handy-game" was the working title EPYX coined in 1987 for what would become the Atari Lynx). The console comes with 25 built-in games and is also able to accept cartridges, however their size and connectors are different from (and incompatible with) previous Gameking consoles. The game selection includes games typically found on NES clones, like 1942, Pooyan or Dig Dug, as well as graphic ROM hacks of famous NES games (for example, using Blue's Journey graphics with Adventure Island).

The GM-228 was available in a large variety of colors with some faceplaces containing very elaborate designs. Colors included silver, black, green, yellow, and pink.

Games

GameKing/GameKing II games
The console has a small selection of known games (38), being 3 built in and 35 in carts, although 37 games were said to be available by TimeTop. Most games are clones of famous NES, C64 or Atari 2600 titles, with heavily dropped graphics. The games come in cartridges resembling the original Game Boy ones, with a typical size of 128KB, although 4-in-1 cartridges are available, containing 4 normal GameKing games plus a selection menu, and have a maximum size of 512KB.

Both the GameKing and GameKing II come with three built in games.
 Drifter, a Wonder Boy/Adventure Island clone (Which seems to use music from Castlevania III: Dracula's Curse)
 2003, a 1942 clone.
 Miner or Mine Battle, a Bomberman clone (Which seems to use music taken from the now-defunct Flash game, Spybot: The Nightfall Incident)

Here follows an incomplete list of known games.
Please note that many GameKing games use the same program altering only graphics to create "new" games e.g. 2003 and 2004 are essentially the same game with minor differences. Also, many games have major inconsistencies between the box, manual and in-game title. E.g., Lanneret becomes Hawk in the game title, Feichuan becomes "Shenzhou Liuhao" in the game,
or Carlo Adventure Legend becomes Caro in-game.

 Carlo Adventure Legend, a Super Mario Bros. clone.
 Soldier, a Contra / Gryzor clone.
 Happy Killer and Happy Ball, both Lode Runner clones.
 F1 2004, a Formula One racing game resembling Pole Position.
 Super Motor, essentially like F1 2004 with motorcycles instead of cars.
Notes: The two previous titles are the only motor or sports games available on the GameKing.
 2004, essentially the same game as the built in 2003.
 Popper, essentially the same game as the built in Miner.
 Hawk or Lanneret, a Choplifter clone.
 Dino Adventure, essentially Carlo Adventure Legend with different graphics.
 Duckman, a Darkwing Duck clone.
 Ares, Feichuan are all classic arcade shooters, probably using the same engine as 2003 and 2004 with different graphics.
 Penguin, an Antarctic Adventure/Tux Racer clone.
 Street Hero, a Double Dragon clone.
 Trojan Legend, a Mega Man clone.
 Seatercel, a Tiger Heli clone.
 Star Wars, a Macross-based clone, allowing the player to choose all three shapeshifting Fighter-Gerwalk-Battroid configurations.
 Nagual, a Kung Fu Master clone.
 Blaster, a Blaster Master clone, a platform game with a shooting vehicle.
 Chaser, a marine defense game (clone unknown).
 Star Ghazi or Star Chazi, a Star Force clone
 HERO: a Batman or H.E.R.O. clone.
 Dracula Zone or Surf Eidolon: A Silver Surfer clone(?).
 Pocket Tank, a Rambo/Front Line clone with a tank.
 Warrior, a Front Line clone without the tank.
 Clever Hawk, a Star Force-like game, but not the same game as Star Ghazi.
 Valliant, a robot space fighting game (clone unknown). The sprites are pretty large.
 Metal Deform, a platform game with shooting elements and a jetpack(?). (clone unknown)
 Three Battles, an Ikari Warriors-like game.
 Lightsword, a shooter that puts you on foot and then into a flying-robot shooter form (clone unknown).
 Risker, a game similar to Spy Hunter in mechanics.
 Catman, another platform game with weapons, but with large sprites.
 Armada, an arcade shooter (clone unknown).
 Brains, a puzzle-action game, clone unknown.

Games are generally sold in separate cartridges, but there are 4-in-1 cartridges holding 4 distinct games. Later games seem to be only available in this manner. Also, each 4-in-1 pack comes numbered and higher numbers seem to provide games that are more refined in presentation.

Some of these games found in 4-in-1 cartridges are:
 
 Cyclon Action
 Might
 CarMan
 Spectask
 Captain (Which seems to use music from Mega Man X)
 Seaguard
 Whirlybird
 Happy Garden
 Airhero
 Magician
 Explorer
 Farer
 Seabedwar
 Sortie
 Phantom Fighter

GameKing III games
GameKing III machines have a built-in game:
 Galaxy Crisis
At the moment the only known game carts for the GameKing III are:
 Adventure
 Urgent Action
 Diamond
 Panzer
 Fly Car
 Blaze Plane
 2030
 Hermic Battle
 Vagrant

HandyGame (GM-228) games
The NES-clone version of the GameKing III has its own selection of games, most of them being pirated or unlicensed NES games or variations. These come multi-carts with combinations such as 26in1, 49in1,and 72in1, etc. No HandyGame carts are compatible with any previous model.

References

External links 

https://web.archive.org/web/20080204211506/http://www.insertcredit.com/archives/000269.html

Handheld game consoles
Monochrome video game consoles
Sixth-generation video game consoles